Jafarabad-e Namtalu (also Romanized as Ja‘farābād-e Nāmtalū) is a village in Fenderesk-e Jonubi Rural District, Fenderesk District, Ramian County, Golestan Province, Iran. This village is the place where Mirza Abolghasem Mirfendereski, the noted philosopher, was born. [At the 2006 census, its population was 985, in 247 families.

References 

Populated places in Ramian County